Elections were held in Illinois on Tuesday, November 6, 1962.

Primaries were held April 10, 1962.

Election information
1962 was a midterm election year in the United States.

Turnout
In the primary election, turnout was 38.76% with 2,109,975 ballots cast (1,171,443 Democratic and 938,532 Republican).

In the general election, turnout was 74.67% with 3,812,120 ballots cast.

Federal elections

United States Senate

Incumbent Republican Everett M. Dirksen won reelection to a third term

United States House 

Illinois had redistricted. It had lost one congressional seat as a result of reapportionment following the 1960 United States Census. The remaining 24 Illinois seats in the United States House of Representatives were up for election in 1962.

Before the election, Illinois had 14 Democratic seats and 11 Republican seats. In 1962, 12 Democrats and 12 Republicans were elected in Illinois.

State elections

Treasurer 

Incumbent Treasurer Francis S. Lorenz, a Democrat appointed in 1961, lost reelection to Republican William J. Scott.

Democratic primary

Republican primary

General election

Superintendent of Public Instruction 

Incumbent  Superintendent of Public Instruction George T. Wilkins, a Democrat seeking a second term, was defeated by Republican Ray Page.

Democratic primary

Republican primary

General election

Clerk of the Supreme Court 
 
Incumbent Clerk of the Supreme Court Fae Searcy, a Republican, won reelection to a second full term.

Instead of being listed by her own name, Searcy opted to be listed on the ballot in both the primary and general election as "Ms. Earle Benjamin Searcy".

Democratic primary

Republican primary

General election

State Senate
Seats in the Illinois Senate were up for election in 1962. Republicans retained control of the chamber.

State House of Representatives
Seats in the Illinois House of Representatives were up for election in 1962. Republicans retained control of the chamber.

Trustees of University of Illinois

An election was held for three of nine seats for Trustees of University of Illinois. 

The election saw the reelection of incumbent second-term Republican Wayne A. Johnston, first-term Republican Earl M. Hughes, and fellow Republican Timothy W. Swain (who had been appointed in 1955, and elected to his first full term in 1956).

Judicial elections

Special judicial elections were held April 10 to fill vacancies. Additionally, the Superior Court of Cook County held elections on November 6.

Supreme Court

Third Supreme Court Judicial District (vacancy caused by the death of George W. Bristow)

Lower courts
Elections were held to fill seven vacancies on the Superior Court of Cook County. Democratic nominees defeated their Republican opponents in all seven elections. The Superior Court of Cook County also held regularly-scheduled elections on November 6.

Ballot measures
Two ballot measures were put before voters in 1962. One was a legislatively referred state statute and one was a legislatively referred constitutional amendment.

In order to be approved, legislatively referred state statues required the support of a majority of those voting on the statute. In order to be placed on the ballot, proposed legislatively referred constitutional amendments needed to be approved by two-thirds of each house of the Illinois General Assembly. In order to be approved, they required approval of either two-thirds of those voting on the amendment itself or a majority of all ballots cast in the general elections.

General Banking Law Amendment 
The General Banking Law Amendment was approved by voters as a legislatively referred state statute. It made modified the state's banking law.

Judicial Amendment
Voters approved the Judicial Amendment, which amended Article VI of the 1870 Constitution of Illinois.

In order for constitutional amendments to be passed by voters, they required either two-thirds support among those specifically voting on the measure or 50% support among all ballots cast in the elections.

Local elections
Local elections were held.

References

 
Illinois